"Der Ritter und die Magd" is a traditional German folk song. With a few (or even one) changes, it was included by Clemens Brentano and Achim von Arnim in their collection of German folk songs and poems, Des Knaben Wunderhorn (1806, I). As its possible source, both editors used a German broadside printed before 1790. Another version of the song, published in Die deutschen Volkslieder mit ihren Singweisen (1843) was recorded from an oral source near Cottbus.

Synopsis 
One knight plays with his maiden and makes her pregnant. He offers her some hundreds thalers and to give her in marriage to his servant, but she refuses and returns to Augsburg, to her mother. The latter one suggests to her daughter: after the birth of the child, to throw him into the river. The young woman, however, decides to leave the baby, feeling her coming death. The knight sees in a sleep that his maiden is on her deathbed. He wakes up and orders his servant to saddle two horses. Near Augsburg they meet four men bearing a dead woman, and the knight recognizes in her his love. He pierces himself with his sword and asks his servant to bury him with her.

Commentary 
J. W. von Goethe described the song as "forced verses" and "dark romance". One source points out that the author of Clavigo ends his play by the same way: the "repentant hero" appears after his love's death.

According to Ferdinand Rieser, the song was published in Des Knaben Wunderhorn (1806) with only one change: the editors replaced 'mit einer Dam' by 'mit seiner Magd' in the first row of the first couplet.

Some scholars classified Der Ritter und die Magd as a ballad.

References

External links 
 

German songs
Ballads